Amar Hodžić (born 12 July 1999) is an Austrian football player. He plays for WSC Hertha Wels.

Career

Club career
He made his Austrian Football Bundesliga debut for Wolfsberger AC on 19 August 2017 in a game against FC Admira Wacker Mödling. On 9 January 2020, Hodžić joined SK Vorwärts Steyr on loan for the rest of the season.

References

External links
 

1999 births
Sportspeople from Klagenfurt
Footballers from Carinthia (state)
Living people
Austrian footballers
Wolfsberger AC players
SK Vorwärts Steyr players
Austrian Football Bundesliga players
2. Liga (Austria) players
Austrian Regionalliga players
Association football forwards